The women's triple jump at the 2016 IAAF World Indoor Championships took place on March 19, 2016.

The first round of jumps were mostly disappointments to these 14 meter jumpers as Keturah Orji was the only one to break that barrier with 14.13.  Four more athletes broke 14 in the second round, with Paraskevi Papachristou barely taking the lead with 14.15 and doing a dance to celebrate.  The lead lasted barely 2 minutes before newcomer Yulimar Rojas popped 14.41.  That jump stood up as the winner of the competition, neither Rojas or Panturoiu could find the board for the rest of their attempts.  Kristin Gierisch edged into second place with a fourth round 14.16, then confirmed her silver medal with a 14.30 in the fifth round.  As the Olympics go to South America for the first time, Rojas joins Caterine Ibargüen as South American athletes at the top of world championships in this event.

Results
The final was started at 11:37.

References

Triple jump
Triple jump at the World Athletics Indoor Championships
2016 in women's athletics